Chi Virginis (χ Vir, χ Virginis) is a double star in the constellation Virgo. It has an apparent visual magnitude of 4.65, which is bright enough to be seen with the unaided eye under suitable viewing conditions.

This star has a stellar classification of K2 III, with the luminosity class "III" indicating that this is a giant star that has consumed the hydrogen at its core and evolved away from the main sequence. It has a mass about double that of the Sun and has expanded to 23 times the Sun's radius, giving it a luminosity of 182 times the luminosity of the Sun. The effective temperature of the star's outer envelope is about 4,395 K, which gives the star the orange hue typical of K-type stars. The abundance of elements other than hydrogen and helium, what astronomers term the star's metallicity, is slightly higher than in the Sun.

This star has three optical companions. At an angular separation of 173.1 arcseconds is a magnitude +9.1 star, which is of spectral type K0. A 10th magnitude star is located 221.2 arcseconds away, and the third is a magnitude +9.1 K2 star 321.2 arcseconds away. None of these have been confirmed as a physical companion.

In July 2009, it was discovered that Chi Virginis has a massive planet with a high orbital eccentricity of 0.46. It is orbiting with a period of about 835 days and has a mass at least 11 times greater than Jupiter. There are indications of a second planet orbiting with a period of 130 days, but this has not been firmly established. But on 19 August 2015, the existence of a second planet, (about three times bigger than Jupiter and having an orbit roughly that of Venus) was confirmed by Chilean astronomer Maritza Soto.

See also 
 70 Virginis
 HD 16760
 Lists of exoplanets

References 

Virginis, Chi
Virginis, 026
Virgo (constellation)
K-type giants
110014
061740
4813
BD-07 3452
Planetary systems with two confirmed planets